Kostas Iasonidis  (born 1 October 1985) is a Greek footballer, who plays for Tilikratis in Gamma Ethniki.

Career
Born in Oinoi, Kastoria, Iasonidis began playing football with Markopoulo F.C.

Career statistics

Last update: 28 June 2010

References

External links
 
Myplayer.gr Profile
Insports
Profile at Onsports.gr

1985 births
Living people
Greek footballers
Super League Greece players
Football League (Greece) players
Panathinaikos F.C. players
Paniliakos F.C. players
Proodeftiki F.C. players
Apollon Smyrnis F.C. players
Kastoria F.C. players
Anagennisi Karditsa F.C. players
Panthrakikos F.C. players
Pierikos F.C. players
Association football defenders
People from Kastoria (regional unit)
Footballers from Western Macedonia